Myceligenerans crystallogenes is a xylan-degrading bacterium from the genus Myceligenerans which has been isolated from tufa from the Catacomb of Domitilla in Rome, Italy.

References

Further reading

External links
Type strain of Myceligenerans crystallogenes at BacDive -  the Bacterial Diversity Metadatabase	

Micrococcales
Bacteria described in 2006